Thomas Nelstrop (born 29 July 1980) is an English actor, comedian, and voiceover artist. He plays Julian in the NBC series Brave New World. In 2007, he played Ben Wainright in the Doctor Who episode "Blink".

Early life 
Nelstrop was born in Hebden Bridge, West Yorkshire. He gained a B.A. degree in Actor Musicianship from Rose Bruford College of Theatre & Performance in 2002.

Career 
Nelstrop based himself in London after graduating from Rose Bruford College to concentrate on performing arts. He received his first acting credits as the 16th and the 17th century English Poet John Donne in Channel 4's educational series Arrows of Desire in 2003.

Nelstrop spent the next three years focussing on acting in theatres, most notably as Sampson/Peter in the production of Romeo and Juliet by the  English Touring Theatre in 2005, while taking on a some TV and film roles from time to time.

In 2007, Nelstrop was chosen to play Ben Wainwright in the critically acclaimed Doctor Who episode Blink, alongside Carey Mulligan and Lucy Gaskell. Following this appearance, he went on to play Constable Harrison in Honest, Wesley Presley in Two Pints of Lager and a Packet of Crisps, and as a recurring cast member in The Impressions Show with Culshaw and Stephenson.

Aside from acting, Nelstrop is also a comedian and made his Edinburgh Festival Fringe debut in 2012  with his own show Thomas Nelstrop: Great (ish) Hits at the Pleasance, which received favourable reviews. He is also known by his spoof musician persona, Jonni Music, whose music videos are often broadcast by BBC Three and BBC Online. In 2013, he was hired to create comedy clips to be broadcast between acts at the Singapore Social music festival which featured Aerosmith, Carly Rae Jepsen, Psy, and Blush.

Filmography

Television

Film

Video Games

References

1980 births
Living people
Alumni of Rose Bruford College
English male stage actors
English male television actors